The Netherlands competed at the 2013 World Aquatics Championships in Barcelona, Spain between 19 July and 4 August 2013.

Medalists

Diving

Netherlands qualified four quota places for the following diving events.

Men

Women

Open water swimming

Netherlands qualified a single quota in open water swimming.

Swimming

Dutch swimmers achieved qualifying standards in the following events (up to a maximum of 2 swimmers in each event at the A-standard entry time, and 1 at the B-standard):

Men

Verschuren tied for the eighth and final spot in the final with Cameron McEvoy from Australia but withdrew from the swimoff to focus on the 100 m freestyle event.

Women

Synchronized swimming

Netherlands has qualified twelve synchronized swimmers.

Water polo

Women's tournament

Team roster

Ilse van der Meijden
Yasemin Smit
Marloes Nijhuis
Biurakn Hakhverdian
Sabrina van der Sloot
Nomi Stomphorst
Iefke van Belkum
Vivian Sevenich
Carolina Slagter
Dagmar Genee
Lieke Klaassen
Leonie van der Molen
Anne Heinis

Group play

Round of 16

Quarterfinal

5th–8th place semifinal

Seventh place game

See also
Netherlands at other World Championships in 2013
 Netherlands at the 2013 UCI Road World Championships
 Netherlands at the 2013 World Championships in Athletics

References

External links
Barcelona 2013 Official Site
Royal Dutch Swimming Federation 

Nations at the 2013 World Aquatics Championships
2013 in Dutch sport
Netherlands at the World Aquatics Championships